Keisuke is a logic puzzle published by Nikoli.

Rules

Keisuke is played on a rectangular grid, in which some cells of the grid are shaded.  Additionally, external to the grid, several numeric values are given, some denoted as horizontal, and some denoted as vertical.

The puzzle functions as a simple numeric crossword puzzle.  The object is to fill in the empty cells with single digits, such that the given numeric values appear on the grid in the orientation specified.

Example

ACROSS → 13, 23, 233, 3221, 21222

DOWN ↓ 12, 21, 22, 232, 3132, 33313

Solution methods

The best way to start a Keisuke is to look for intersecting digits in the combinations possible within the grid.  For example, if the grid shows only one 2-digit/4-digit intersection, and among the 2- and 4-digit numbers, there is only one combination which shares the intersecting digit, the correct values have been found.

See also
 Fill-In (puzzle)
 List of Nikoli puzzle types

External links
Nikoli's Japanese page on Keisuke

Logic puzzles